Ryp, or RYP, may refer to:

 Juan José Ryp (b.1971), a Spanish comic book artist
 RYP, the National Rail code for Ryde Pier Head railway station on the Isle of Wight, UK
 Ryp (Utrecht) (?-1718), a Christian Hebraist from Utrecht, Netherlands

See also 
 
 
 Rip (disambiguation)